Rama is a major deity in Hinduism. He is the seventh and one of the most popular avatars of Vishnu. In Rama-centric traditions of Hinduism, he is considered the Supreme Being.

Rama is said to have been born to Kaushalya and Dasharatha in Ayodhya, the capital of the Kingdom of Kosala. His siblings included Lakshmana, Bharata, and Shatrughna. He married Sita. Though born in a royal family, Rama's life is described in the Hindu texts as one challenged by unexpected changes such as an exile into impoverished and difficult circumstances, ethical questions and moral dilemmas. Of all his travails, the most notable is the kidnapping of Sita by demon-king Ravana, followed by the determined and epic efforts of Rama and Lakshmana to gain her freedom and destroy the evil Ravana against great odds. The entire life story of Rama, Sita and their companions allegorically discusses duties, rights and social responsibilities of an individual. It illustrates dharma and dharmic living through model characters.

Rama is especially important to Vaishnavism. He is the central figure of the ancient Hindu epic Ramayana, a text historically popular in the South Asian and Southeast Asian cultures. His ancient legends have attracted bhasya (commentaries) and extensive secondary literature and inspired performance arts. Two such texts, for example, are the Adhyatma Ramayana – a spiritual and theological treatise considered foundational by Ramanandi monasteries, and the Ramcharitmanas – a popular treatise that inspires thousands of Ramlila festival performances during autumn every year in India.

Rama legends are also found in the texts of Jainism and Buddhism, though he is sometimes called Pauma or Padma in these texts, and their details vary significantly from the Hindu versions. Jain Texts also mentioned Rama as the eighth balabhadra among the 63 salakapurusas. In Sikhism, Rama is mentioned as one of twenty four divine incarnations of Vishnu in the Chaubis Avtar in Dasam Granth.

Etymology and nomenclature
Rama is also known as Ram, Raman, Ramar, and Ramachandra. Rāma is a Vedic Sanskrit word with two contextual meanings. In one context as found in Atharva Veda, as stated by Monier Monier-Williams, means "dark, dark-colored, black" and is related to the term ratri which means night. In another context as found in other Vedic texts, the word means "pleasing, delightful, charming, beautiful, lovely". The word is sometimes used as a suffix in different Indian languages and religions, such as Pali in Buddhist texts, where -rama adds the sense of "pleasing to the mind, lovely" to the composite word.

Rama as a first name appears in the Vedic literature, associated with two patronymic names – Margaveya and Aupatasvini – representing different individuals. A third individual named Rama Jamadagnya is the purported author of hymn 10.110 of the Rigveda in the Hindu tradition. The word Rama appears in ancient literature in reverential terms for three individuals:

Parashu-rama, as the sixth avatar of Vishnu. He is linked to the Rama Jamadagnya of the Rigveda fame.
Rama-chandra, as the seventh avatar of Vishnu and of the ancient Ramayana fame.
Bala-rama, also called Halayudha, as the elder brother of Krishna both of whom appear in the legends of Hinduism, Buddhism and Jainism.

The name Rama appears repeatedly in Hindu texts, for many different scholars and kings in mythical stories. The word also appears in ancient Upanishads and Aranyakas layer of Vedic literature, as well as music and other post-Vedic literature, but in qualifying context of something or someone who is "charming, beautiful, lovely" or "darkness, night".

The Vishnu avatar named Rama is also known by other names. He is called Ramachandra (beautiful, lovely moon), or Dasarathi (son of Dasaratha), or Raghava (descendant of Raghu, solar dynasty in Hindu cosmology). He is also known as Ram Lalla (Infant form of Rama).

Additional names of Rama include Ramavijaya (Javanese), Phreah Ream (Khmer), Phra Ram (Lao and Thai), Megat Seri Rama (Malay), Raja Bantugan (Maranao), Ramudu (Telugu), Ramar (Tamil). In the Vishnu sahasranama, Rama is the 394th name of Vishnu. In some Advaita Vedanta inspired texts, Rama connotes the metaphysical concept of Supreme Brahman who is the eternally blissful spiritual Self (Atman, soul) in whom yogis delight nondualistically.

The root of the word Rama is ram- which means "stop, stand still, rest, rejoice, be pleased".

According to Douglas Q. Adams, the Sanskrit word Rama is also found in other Indo-European languages such as Tocharian ram, reme, *romo- where it means "support, make still", "witness, make evident". The sense of "dark, black, soot" also appears in other Indo European languages, such as *remos or Old English romig.

Legends
This summary is a traditional legendary account, based on literary details from the Ramayana and other historic mythology-containing texts of Buddhism and Jainism. According to Sheldon Pollock, the figure of Rama incorporates more ancient "morphemes of Indian myths", such as the mythical legends of Bali and Namuci. The ancient sage Valmiki used these morphemes in his Ramayana similes as in sections 3.27, 3.59, 3.73, 5.19 and 29.28.

Birth

The ancient epic Ramayana states in the Balakhanda that Rama and his brothers were born to Kaushalya and Dasharatha in Ayodhya, a city on the banks of Sarayu River. The Jain versions of the Ramayana, such as the Paumacariya (literally deeds of Padma) by Vimalasuri, also mention the details of the early life of Rama. The Jain texts are dated variously, but generally pre-500 CE, most likely sometime within the first five centuries of the common era. Moriz Winternitz states that the Valmiki Ramayana was already famous before it was recast in the Jain Paumacariya poem, dated to the second half of the 1st century CE, which pre-dates a similar retelling found in the Buddha-carita of Asvagosa, dated to the beginning of the 2nd century CE or prior.

Dasharatha was the king of Kosala, and a part of the solar dynasty of Iksvakus. His mother's name Kaushalya literally implies that she was from Kosala. The kingdom of Kosala is also mentioned in Buddhist and Jain texts, as one of the sixteen Maha janapadas of ancient India, and as an important center of pilgrimage for Jains and Buddhists. However, there is a scholarly dispute whether the modern Ayodhya is indeed the same as the Ayodhya and Kosala mentioned in the Ramayana and other ancient Indian texts.

Youth, family and friends

Rama had three brothers, according to the Balakhanda section of the Ramayana. These were Lakshmana, Bharata and Shatrughna. The extant manuscripts of the text describes their education and training as young princes, but this is brief. Rama is portrayed as a polite, self-controlled, virtuous youth always ready to help others. His education included the Vedas, the Vedangas as well as the martial arts.

The years when Rama grew up are described in much greater detail by later Hindu texts, such as the Ramavali by Tulsidas. The template is similar to those found for Krishna, but in the poems of Tulsidas, Rama is milder and reserved introvert, rather than the prank-playing extrovert personality of Krishna.

The Ramayana mentions an archery contest organised by King Janaka, where Sita and Rama meet. Rama wins the contest, whereby Janaka agrees to the marriage of Sita and Rama. Sita moves with Rama to his father Dashratha's capital.

While Rama and his brothers were away, Kaikeyi, the mother of Bharata and the second wife of King Dasharatha, reminds the king that he had promised long ago to comply with one thing she asks, anything. Dasharatha remembers and agrees to do so. She demands that Rama be exiled for fourteen years to Dandaka forest. Dasharatha grieves at her request. Her son Bharata, and other family members become upset at her demand. Rama states that his father should keep his word, adds that he does not crave for earthly or heavenly material pleasures, neither seeks power nor anything else. He talks about his decision with his wife and tells everyone that time passes quickly. Sita leaves with him to live in the forest, the brother Lakshmana joins them in their exile as the caring close brother.

Exile and war

Rama heads outside the Kosala kingdom, crosses Yamuna river and initially stays at Chitrakuta, on the banks of river Mandakini, in the hermitage of sage Vasishtha. During the exile, Rama meets one of his devotee, Shabari who happened to love him so much that when Rama asked something to eat she offered her ber, a fruit. But every time she gave it to him she first tasted it to ensure that it was sweet and tasty as a testament to her devotion. Rama also understood her devotion and ate all the half-eaten bers given by her. Such was the reciprocation of love and compassion he had for his people. This place is believed in the Hindu tradition to be the same as Chitrakoot on the border of Uttar Pradesh and Madhya Pradesh. The region has numerous Rama temples and is an important Vaishnava pilgrimage site. The texts describe nearby hermitages of Vedic rishis (sages) such as Atri, and that Rama roamed through forests, lived a humble simple life, provided protection and relief to ascetics in the forest being harassed and persecuted by demons, as they stayed at different ashrams.

After ten years of wandering and struggles, Rama arrives at Panchavati, on the banks of river Godavari. This region had numerous demons (rakshashas). One day, a demoness called Shurpanakha saw Rama, became enamored of him, and tried to seduce him. Rama refused her. Shurpanakha retaliated by threatening Sita. Lakshmana, the younger brother protective of his family, in turn retaliated by cutting off the nose and ears of Shurpanakha. The cycle of violence escalated, ultimately reaching demon king Ravana, who was the brother of Shurpanakha. Ravana comes to Panchavati to take revenge on behalf of his family, sees Sita, gets attracted, and kidnaps her to his kingdom of Lanka (believed to be modern Sri Lanka).

Rama and Lakshmana discover the kidnapping, worry about Sita's safety, despair at the loss and their lack of resources to take on Ravana. Their struggles now reach new heights. They travel south, meet Sugriva, marshall an army of monkeys, and attract dedicated commanders such as Hanuman who was a minister of Sugriva. Meanwhile, Ravana harasses Sita to be his wife, queen or goddess. Sita refuses him. Ravana gets enraged and ultimately reaches Lanka, fights in a war that has many ups and downs, but ultimately Rama prevails, kills Ravana and forces of evil, and rescues his wife Sita. They return to Ayodhya.

Post-war rule, death and re-appearance

The return of Rama to Ayodhya was celebrated with his coronation. It is called Rama pattabhisheka, and his rule itself as Rama rajya described to be a just and fair rule. It is believed by many that when Rama returned people celebrated their happiness with diyas (lamps), and the festival of Diwali is connected with Rama's return.

Upon Rama's accession as king, rumors emerge that Sita may have gone willingly when she was with Ravana; Sita protests that her capture was forced. Rama responds to public gossip by renouncing his wife and asking her to undergo a test before Agni (fire). She does and passes the test. Rama and Sita live happily together in Ayodhya, have twin sons named Luv and Kush, in the Ramayana and other major texts. However, in some revisions, the story is different and tragic, with Sita dying of sorrow for her husband not trusting her, making Sita a moral heroine and leaving the reader with moral questions about Rama. In these revisions, the death of Sita leads Rama to drown himself. Through death, he joins her in afterlife. Depiction of Rama dying by drowning himself and then emerging in the sky as a six-armed incarnate of the lord Vishnu is found in the Burmese version of  Rama's life story called Thiri Rama.

Inconsistencies
Rama's legends vary significantly by the region and across manuscripts. While there is a common foundation, plot, grammar and an essential core of values associated with a battle between good and evil, there is neither a correct version nor a single verifiable ancient one. According to Paula Richman, there are hundreds of versions of "the story of Rama in India, Southeast Asia and beyond". The versions vary by region reflecting local preoccupations and histories, and these cannot be called "divergences or different tellings" from the "real" version, rather all the versions of Rama story are real and true in their own meanings to the local cultural tradition, according to scholars such as Richman and Ramanujan.

The stories vary in details, particularly where the moral question is clear, but the appropriate ethical response is unclear or disputed. For example, when demoness Shurpanakha disguises as a woman to seduce Rama, then stalks and harasses Rama's wife Sita after Rama refuses her, Lakshmana is faced with the question of appropriate ethical response. In the Indian tradition, states Richman, the social value is that "a warrior must never harm a woman". The details of the response by Rama and Lakshmana, and justifications for it, has numerous versions. Similarly, there are numerous and very different versions to how Rama deals with rumours against Sita when they return victorious to Ayodhya, given that the rumours can neither be objectively investigated nor summarily ignored. Similarly the versions vary on many other specific situations and closure such as how Rama, Sita and Lakshmana die.

The variation and inconsistencies are not limited to the texts found in the Hinduism traditions. The Rama story in the Jain tradition also show variation by author and region, in details, in implied ethical prescriptions and even in names – the older versions using the name Padma instead of Rama, while the later Jain texts just use Rama.

Dating

In some Hindu texts, Rama is stated to have lived in the Treta Yuga that their authors estimate existed before about 5,000 BCE. A few other researchers place Rama to have more plausibly lived around 1250 BCE, based on regnal lists of Kuru and Vrishni leaders which if given more realistic reign lengths would place Bharat and Satwata, contemporaries of Rama, around that period. Archaeologist H. S. Sankalia, who specialised in Proto- and Ancient Indian history, find such figures to be "pure speculation" and dates various incidents of the Ramayana to have taken place as early as 1,500 BCE.

The composition of Rama's epic story, the Ramayana, in its current form is usually dated between 7th and 4th century BCE. According to John Brockington, a professor of Sanskrit at Oxford known for his publications on the Ramayana, the original text was likely composed and transmitted orally in more ancient times, and modern scholars have suggested various centuries in the 1st millennium BCE. In Brockington's view, "based on the language, style and content of the work, a date of roughly the fifth century BCE is the most reasonable estimate".

Appearance 

Valmiki in Ramayana describes Rama as a charming, well built person of a dark complexion (varṇam śyāmam) and long arms (ājānabāhu, meaning a person whose middle finger reaches beyond their knee). In the Sundara Kanda section of the epic, Hanuman describes Rama to Sita when she is held captive in Lanka  to prove to her that he is indeed a messenger from Rama:

Iconography
Rama iconography shares elements of Vishnu avatars, but has several distinctive elements. It never has more than two hands, he holds (or has nearby) a bana (arrow) in his right hand, while he holds the dhanus (bow) in his left. The most recommended icon for him is that he be shown standing in tribhanga pose (thrice bent "S" shape). He is shown black, blue or dark color, typically wearing reddish color clothes. If his wife and brother are a part of the iconography, Lakshamana is on his left side while Sita always on the right of Rama, both of golden-yellow complexion.

Philosophy and symbolism
Rama's life story is imbued with symbolism. According to Sheldon Pollock, the life of Rama as told in the Indian texts is a masterpiece that offers a framework to represent, conceptualise and comprehend the world and the nature of life. Like major epics and religious stories around the world, it has been of vital relevance because it "tells the culture what it is". Rama's life is more complex than the Western template for the battle between the good and the evil, where there is a clear distinction between immortal powerful gods or heroes and mortal struggling humans. In the Indian traditions, particularly Rama, the story is about a divine human, a mortal god, incorporating both into the exemplar who transcends both humans and gods.

As a person, Rama personifies the characteristics of an ideal person (purushottama). He had within him all the desirable virtues that any individual would seek to aspire, and he fulfils all his moral obligations. Rama is considered a maryada purushottama or the best of upholders of Dharma.

According to Rodrick Hindery, Book 2, 6 and 7 are notable for ethical studies. The views of Rama combine "reason with emotions" to create a "thinking hearts" approach. Second, he emphasises through what he says and what he does a union of "self-consciousness and action" to create an "ethics of character". Third, Rama's life combines the ethics with the aesthetics of living. The story of Rama and people in his life raises questions such as "is it appropriate to use evil to respond to evil?", and then provides a spectrum of views within the framework of Indian beliefs such as on karma and dharma.

Rama's life and comments emphasise that one must pursue and live life fully, that all three life aims are equally important: virtue (dharma), desires (kama), and legitimate acquisition of wealth (artha). Rama also adds, such as in section 4.38 of the Ramayana, that one must also introspect and never neglect what one's proper duties, appropriate responsibilities, true interests, and legitimate pleasures are.

Literary sources

Ramayana
The primary source of the life of Rama is the Sanskrit epic Ramayana composed by Rishi Valmiki.

The epic had many versions across India's regions. The followers of Madhvacharya believe that an older version of the Ramayana, the Mula-Ramayana, previously existed. The Madhva tradition considers it to have been more authoritative than the version by Valmiki.

Versions of the Ramayana exist in most major Indian languages; examples that elaborate on the life, deeds and divine philosophies of Rama include the epic poem Ramavataram, and the following vernacular versions of Rama's life story:
Ramavataram or Kamba-Ramayanam in Tamil by the poet Kambar. (12th century)
Saptakanda Ramayana in Assamese by poet Madhava Kandali. (14th century)
Krittivasi Ramayana in Bengali by poet Krittibas Ojha. (15th century)
Ramcharitmanas in Hindi by sant Tulsidas. (16th-century)
Pampa Ramayana, Torave Ramayana by Kumara Valmiki and Sri Ramayana Darshanam by Kuvempu in Kannada;
Ramayana Kalpavruksham by Viswanatha Satyanarayana and Ramayana by Ranganatha in Telugu;
Vilanka Ramayana in Odia;
Eluttachan in Malayalam (this text is closer to the Advaita Vedanta-inspired rendition Adhyatma Ramayana).

The epic is found across India, in different languages and cultural traditions.

Adhyatma Ramayana
Adhyatma Ramayana is a late medieval Sanskrit text extolling the spiritualism in the story of Ramayana. It is embedded in the latter portion of Brahmānda Purana, and constitutes about a third of it. The text philosophically attempts to reconcile Bhakti in god Rama and Shaktism with Advaita Vedanta, over 65 chapters and 4,500 verses.

The text represents Rama as the Brahman (metaphysical reality), mapping all attributes and aspects of Rama to abstract virtues and spiritual ideals. Adhyatma Ramayana transposes Ramayana into symbolism of self study of one's own soul, with metaphors described in Advaita terminology. The text is notable because it influenced the popular Ramcharitmanas by Tulsidas, and inspired the most popular version of Nepali Ramayana by Bhanubhakta Acharya. This was also translated by Thunchath Ezhuthachan to Malayalam, which lead the foundation of Malayalam literature itself.

Ramacharitmanas
The Ramayana is a Sanskrit text, while Ramacharitamanasa retells the Ramayana in a vernacular dialect of Hindi language, commonly understood in northern India. Ramacharitamanasa was composed in the 16th century by Tulsidas. The popular text is notable for synthesising the epic story in a Bhakti movement framework, wherein the original legends and ideas morph in an expression of spiritual bhakti (devotional love) for a personal god.

Tulsidas was inspired by Adhyatma Ramayana, where Rama and other characters of the Valmiki Ramayana along with their attributes (saguna narrative) were transposed into spiritual terms and abstract rendering of an Atma (soul, self, Brahman) without attributes (nirguna reality). According to Kapoor, Rama's life story in the Ramacharitamanasa combines mythology, philosophy, and religious beliefs into a story of life, a code of ethics, a treatise on universal human values. It debates in its dialogues the human dilemmas, the ideal standards of behaviour, duties to those one loves, and mutual responsibilities. It inspires the audience to view their own lives from a spiritual plane, encouraging the virtuous to keep going, and comforting those oppressed with a healing balm.

The Ramacharitmanas is notable for being the Rama-based play commonly performed every year in autumn, during the weeklong performance arts festival of Ramlila. The "staging of the Ramayana based on the Ramacharitmanas" was inscribed in 2008 by UNESCO as one of the Intangible Cultural Heritages of Humanity.

Yoga Vasistha

Yoga Vasistha is a Sanskrit text structured as a conversation between young Prince Rama and sage Vasistha who was called as the first sage of the Vedanta school of Hindu philosophy by Adi Shankara. The complete text contains over 29,000 verses. The short version of the text is called Laghu Yogavasistha and contains 6,000 verses. The exact century of its completion is unknown, but has been estimated to be somewhere between the 6 century to as late as the 14 century, but it is likely that a version of the text existed in the 1 millennium.

The Yoga Vasistha text consists of six books. The first book presents Rama's frustration with the nature of life, human suffering and disdain for the world. The second describes, through the character of Rama, the desire for liberation and the nature of those who seek such liberation. The third and fourth books assert that liberation comes through a spiritual life, one that requires self-effort, and present cosmology and metaphysical theories of existence embedded in stories. These two books are known for emphasising free will and human creative power. The fifth book discusses meditation and its powers in liberating the individual, while the last book describes the state of an enlightened and blissful Rama.

Yoga Vasistha is considered one of the most important texts of the Vedantic philosophy. The text, states David Gordon White, served as a reference on Yoga for medieval era Advaita Vedanta scholars. The Yoga Vasistha, according to White, was one of the popular texts on Yoga that dominated the Indian Yoga culture scene before the 12th century.

Other texts
Other important historic Hindu texts on Rama include Bhusundi Ramanaya, Prasanna raghava, and  Ramavali by Tulsidas. The Sanskrit poem Bhaṭṭikāvya of Bhatti, who lived in Gujarat in the seventh century CE, is a retelling of the epic that simultaneously illustrates the grammatical examples for Pāṇini's Aṣṭādhyāyī as well as the major figures of speech and the Prakrit language.

Another historically and chronologically important text is Raghuvamsa authored by Kalidasa. Its story confirms many details of the Ramayana, but has novel and different elements. It mentions that Ayodhya was not the capital in the time of Rama's son named Kusha, but that he later returned to it and made it the capital again. This text is notable because the poetry in the text is exquisite and called a Mahakavya in the Indian tradition, and has attracted many scholarly commentaries. It is also significant because Kalidasa has been dated to between the 4th and 5th century CE, suggesting that the Ramayana legend was well established by the time of Kalidasa.

The Mahabharata has a summary of the Ramayana. The Jainism tradition has extensive literature of Rama as well, but generally refers to him as Padma, such as in the Paumacariya by Vimalasuri. Rama and Sita legend is mentioned in the Jataka tales of Buddhism, as Dasaratha-Jataka (Tale no. 461), but with slightly different spellings such as Lakkhana for Lakshmana and Rama-pandita for Rama.

The chapter 4 of Vishnu Purana, chapter 112 of Padma Purana, chapter 143 of Garuda Purana and chapters 5 through 11 of Agni Purana also summarise the life story of Rama. Additionally, the Rama story is included in the Vana Parva of the Mahabharata, which has been a part of evidence that the Ramayana is likely more ancient, and it was summarised in the Mahabharata epic in ancient times.

Influence

Rama's story has had a major socio-cultural and inspirational influence across South Asia and Southeast Asia.

Few works of literature produced in any place at any time have been as popular, influential, imitated and successful as the great and ancient Sanskrit epic poem, the Valmiki Ramayana.
– Robert Goldman, Professor of Sanskrit, University of California at Berkeley.

According to Arthur Anthony Macdonell, a professor at Oxford and Boden scholar of Sanskrit, Rama's ideas as told in the Indian texts are secular in origin, their influence on the life and thought of people having been profound over at least two and a half millennia. Their influence has ranged from being a framework for personal introspection to cultural festivals and community entertainment. His life stories, states Goldman, have inspired "painting, film, sculpture, puppet shows, shadow plays, novels, poems, TV serials and plays."

Hinduism

Rama Navami

Rama Navami is a spring festival that celebrates the birthday of Rama. The festival is a part of the spring Navratri, and falls on the ninth day of the bright half of Chaitra month in the traditional Hindu calendar. This typically occurs in the Gregorian months of March or April every year.

The day is marked by recital of Rama legends in temples, or reading of Rama stories at home. Some Vaishnava Hindus visit a temple, others pray within their home, and some participate in a bhajan or kirtan with music as a part of puja and aarti. The community organises charitable events and volunteer meals. The festival is an occasion for moral reflection for many Hindus. Some mark this day by vrata (fasting) or a visit to a river for a dip.

The important celebrations on this day take place at Ayodhya, Sitamarhi, Janakpurdham (Nepal), Bhadrachalam, Kodandarama Temple, Vontimitta and Rameswaram. Rathayatras, the chariot processions, also known as Shobha yatras of Rama, Sita, his brother Lakshmana and Hanuman, are taken out at several places. In Ayodhya, many take a dip in the sacred river Sarayu and then visit the Rama temple.

Rama Navami day also marks the end of the nine-day spring festival celebrated in Karnataka and Andhra Pradesh called Vasanthothsavam (Festival of Spring), that starts with Ugadi. Some highlights of this day are Kalyanam (ceremonial wedding performed by temple priests) at Bhadrachalam on the banks of the river Godavari in Bhadradri Kothagudem district of Telangana, preparing and sharing Panakam which is a sweet drink prepared with jaggery and pepper, a procession and Rama temple decorations.

Ramlila and Dussehra

Rama's life is remembered and celebrated every year with dramatic plays and fireworks in autumn. This is called Ramlila, and the play follows Ramayana or more commonly the Ramcharitmanas. It is observed through thousands of Rama-related performance arts and dance events, that are staged during the festival of Navratri in India. After the enactment of the legendary war between Good and Evil, the Ramlila celebrations climax in the Dussehra (Dasara, Vijayadashami) night festivities where the giant grotesque effigies of Evil such as of demon Ravana are burnt, typically with fireworks.

The Ramlila festivities were declared by UNESCO as one of the "Intangible Cultural Heritages of Humanity" in 2008. Ramlila is particularly notable in historically important Hindu cities of Ayodhya, Varanasi, Vrindavan, Almora, Satna and Madhubani – cities in Uttar Pradesh, Uttarakhand, Bihar and Madhya Pradesh. The epic and its dramatic play migrated into southeast Asia in the 1st millennium CE, and Ramayana based Ramlila is a part of performance arts culture of Indonesia, particularly the Hindu society of Bali, Myanmar, Cambodia and Thailand.

Diwali

In some parts of India, Rama's return to Ayodhya and his coronation is the main reason for celebrating Diwali, also known as the Festival of Lights.

In Guyana, Diwali is marked as a special occasion and celebrated with a lot of fanfare. It is observed as a national holiday in this part of the world and some ministers of the Government also take part in the celebrations publicly. Just like Vijayadashmi, Diwali is celebrated by different communities across India to commemorate different events in addition to Rama's return to Ayodhya. For example, many communities celebrate one day of Diwali to celebrate the Victory of Krishna over the demon Narakasur.

Hindu arts in Southeast Asia

Rama's life story, both in the written form of Sanskrit Ramayana and the oral tradition arrived in southeast Asia in the 1st millennium CE. Rama was one of many ideas and cultural themes adopted, others being the Buddha, the Shiva and host of other Brahmanic and Buddhist ideas and stories. In particular, the influence of Rama and other cultural ideas grew in Java, Bali, Malaya, Burma, Thailand, Cambodia and Laos.

The Ramayana was translated from Sanskrit into old Javanese around 860 CE, while the performance arts culture most likely developed from the oral tradition inspired by the Tamil and Bengali versions of Rama-based dance and plays. The earliest evidence of these performance arts are from 243 CE according to Chinese records. Other than the celebration of Rama's life with dance and music, Hindu temples built in southeast Asia such as the Prambanan near Yogyakarta (Java), and at the Panataran near Blitar (East Java), show extensive reliefs depicting Rama's life. The story of Rama's life has been popular in Southeast Asia.

In the 14th century, the Ayutthaya Kingdom and its capital Ayuttaya was named after the Hindu holy city of Ayodhya, with the official religion of the state being Theravada Buddhism. Thai kings, continuing into the contemporary era, have been called Rama, a name inspired by Rama of Ramakien – the local version of Sanskrit Ramayana, according to Constance Jones and James Ryan. For example, King Chulalongkorn (1853–1910) is also known as Rama V, while King Vajiralongkorn who succeeded to the throne in 2016 is called Rama X.

Jainism

In Jainism, the earliest known version of Rama story is variously dated from the 1st to 5th century CE. This Jain text credited to Vimalasuri shows no signs of distinction between Digambara-Svetambara (sects of Jainism), and is in a combination of Marathi and Sauraseni languages. These features suggest that this text has ancient roots.

In Jain cosmology, characters continue to be reborn as they evolve in their spiritual qualities, until they reach the Jina state and complete enlightenment. This idea is explained as cyclically reborn triads in its Puranas, called the Baladeva, Vasudeva and evil Prati-vasudeva. Rama, Lakshmana and evil Ravana are the eighth triad, with Rama being the reborn Baladeva, and Lakshmana as the reborn Vasudeva. Rama is described to have lived long before the 22nd Jain Tirthankara called Neminatha. In the Jain tradition, Neminatha is believed to have been born 84,000 years before the 9th-century BCE Parshvanatha.

Jain texts tell a very different version of the Rama legend than the Hindu texts such as by Valmiki. According to the Jain version, Lakshmana (Vasudeva) is the one who kills Ravana (Prativasudeva). Rama, after all his participation in the rescue of Sita and preparation for war, he actually does not kill, thus remains a non-violent person. The Rama of Jainism has numerous wives as does Lakshmana, unlike the virtue of monogamy given to Rama in the Hindu texts. Towards the end of his life, Rama becomes a Jaina monk then successfully attains siddha followed by moksha. His first wife Sita becomes a Jaina nun at the end of the story. In the Jain version, Lakshmana and Ravana both go to the hell of Jain cosmology, because Ravana killed many, while Lakshmana killed Ravana to stop Ravana's violence. Padmapurana mentions Rama as a contemporary of Munisuvrata, 20th tirthankara of Jainism.

Buddhism
The Dasaratha-Jataka (Tale no. 461) provides a version of the Rama story. It calls Rama as Rama-pandita.

At the end of this Dasaratha-Jataka discourse, the Buddhist text declares that the Buddha in his prior rebirth was Rama:

While the Buddhist Jataka texts co-opt Rama and make him an incarnation of Buddha in a previous life, the Hindu texts co-opt the Buddha and make him an avatar of Vishnu. The Jataka literature of Buddhism is generally dated to be from the second half of the 1st millennium BCE, based on the carvings in caves and Buddhist monuments such as the Bharhut stupa. The 2nd-century BCE stone relief carvings on Bharhut stupa, as told in the Dasaratha-Jataka, is the earliest known non-textual evidence of Rama story being prevalent in ancient India.

Sikhism

Rama is mentioned as one of twenty four divine incarnations of Vishnu in the Chaubis Avtar, a composition in Dasam Granth traditionally and historically attributed to Guru Gobind Singh. The discussion of Rama and Krishna avatars is the most extensive in this section of the secondary Sikh scripture. The name of Rama is mentioned more than 2,500 times in the Guru Granth Sahib and is considered as avatar along with the Krishna.

Among people
In Assam, Boro people call themselves Ramsa, which means Children of Ram.

In Chhattisgarh, Ramnami people tattooed their whole body with name of Ram.

Worship and temples

Worship 

Rama is a revered Vaishanava deity, one who is worshipped privately at home or in temples. He was a part of the Bhakti movement focus, particularly because of efforts of 14th century North Indian poet-saint Ramananda who created the Ramanandi Sampradaya, a sannyasi community. This community has grown to become the largest Hindu monastic community in modern times. This Rama-inspired movement has championed social reforms, accepting members without discriminating anyone by gender, class, caste or religion since the time of Ramananda who accepted Muslims wishing to leave Islam. Traditional scholarship holds that his disciples included later Bhakti movement poet-saints such as Kabir, Ravidas, Bhagat Pipa and others.

Temples

Temples dedicated to Rama are found all over India and in places where Indian migrant communities have resided. In most temples, the iconography of Rama is accompanied by that of his wife Sita and brother Lakshmana. In some instances, Hanuman is also included either near them or in the temple premises.

Hindu temples dedicated to Rama were built by early 5th century, according to copper plate inscription evidence, but these have not survived. The oldest surviving Rama temple is near Raipur (Chhattisgarh), called the Rajiva-locana temple at Rajim near the Mahanadi river. It is in a temple complex dedicated to Vishnu and dates back to the 7th-century with some restoration work done around 1145 CE based on epigraphical evidence. The temple remains important to Rama devotees in the contemporary times, with devotees and monks gathering there on dates such as Rama Navami.

Some of Rama temples include:

 Rama temple, Ram Janmabhoomi, Ayodhya, Uttar Pradesh.
 Bhadrachalam Temple, Telangana.
 Kodandarama Temple, Vontimitta, Andhra Pradesh.
 Ramateertham Temple, Andhra Pradesh.
 Ramaswamy Temple, Kumbakonam 
 Mudikondan Kothandaramar Temple, Tamil Nadu.
 Vijayaraghava Perumal temple, Tamil Nadu. 
 Punnainallur Kothandaramar Temple, Tamil Nadu
 Triprayar Sriramaswami Kshetram, Triprayar, Kerala.
 Kalaram Temple, Nashik, Maharashtra.
 Raghunath Temple, Jammu.
 Ram Mandir, Bhubaneswar, Odisha.
 Kodandarama Temple, Chikmagalur, Karnataka. 
 Kothandarama Temple, Thillaivilagam, Tamilnadu.
 Kothandaramaswamy Temple, Rameswaram, Tamil Nadu.
 Odogaon Raghunath Temple, Odisha.
 Ramchaura Mandir, Bihar.
 Sri Rama Temple, Ramapuram, Kerala.
 Vilwadrinatha Temple, Thiruvilwamala, Kerala.

Popular culture 

Rama has been considered as a source of inspiration and has been described as Maryāda Puruṣottama Rāma. He has been depicted in many films, television shows and plays.

See also

 Ayodhya dispute
 Ram Mandir, Ayodhya
 Culture of India
 Genealogy of Rama
 Hindu philosophy
 Natyashastra
 Ram Nam
 Ram Statue
 Jai Shri Ram
 Ramayan (1987 TV series)
 Rama in Jainism
 Rama in Sikhism
 Ramayana
 Dashavatara
 Vaishnavism
 Erlang Shen

References

Notes

Citations

Sources

Further reading

External links

 
Ancient Indian culture
Indian monarchs
Avatars of Vishnu
Ayyavazhi mythology
Buddhist gods
Characters in the Mahabharata
Characters in the Ramayana
Creator gods
Heavenly attendants in Jainism
Hindu given names
Hindu gods
Solar dynasty
Names of God in Hinduism
Salakapurusa
Savior gods
Names of God in Sikhism
Kshatriya
Suryavansha